The 2009 Indiana Fever season was their 10th season in the Women's National Basketball Association (WNBA). The Fever attempted to advance to the WNBA Playoffs for the fifth consecutive season and were successful. The Fever reached their first WNBA Finals, but fell short in 5 games to the Phoenix Mercury.

Offseason

Dispersal draft
Based on the Fever's 2008 record, they would pick 6th in the Houston Comets dispersal draft. The Fever picked Erica White.

WNBA draft
The following are the Fever's selections in the 2009 WNBA draft.

Transactions
June 17: The Fever signed Jessica Davenport and waived Yolanda Griffith.
June 11: The Fever signed Jessica Moore and Eshaya Murphy and waived Erica White and Kadijah Whittington.
June 4: The Fever waived Danielle Campbell and Tan White.
May 21: The Fever waived Doneeka Lewis and Sherill Baker.
May 4: The Fever signed Tamecka Dixon.
April 20: The Fever waived Allison Feaster.
March 4: The Fever signed Sherill Baker and Doneeka Lewis to a training camp contracts.
February 20: The Fever signed Yolanda Griffith.
January 8: The Fever re-signed free agent Tully Bevilaqua to a multiyear contract and waived Kristen Mann.

Free agents

Additions

Subtractions

Roster

Season standings

Schedule

Preseason

|- align="center" bgcolor="bbffbb"
| 1 || May 23 || 1:00 pm || @ Minnesota || 68-51 || Douglas (19) || Sutton-Brown (5) || Catchings, January (3) || Claire Lynch Hall  475 || 1-0
|- align="center" bgcolor="bbffbb"
| 2 || May 28 || 7:00 pm || Chicago || 74-67 || Douglas (15) || Sutton-Brown (7) || Catchings, January (3) || Conseco Fieldhouse  6,457 || 2-0
|- align="center" bgcolor="bbffbb"
| 3 || June 2 || 10:00 pm || @ San Antonio || 67-60 || Catchings (16) || Whittington (6) || Catchings (4) || Austin Convention Center  N/A || 3-0
|-

Regular season

|- align="center" bgcolor="ffbbbb"
| 1 || June 6 || 7:00 pm || @ Atlanta ||  || 86-87 (2OT) || Douglas (22) || Catchings (9) || January (5) || Philips Arena  8,709 || 0-1
|- align="center" bgcolor="ffbbbb"
| 2 || June 7 || 7:00 pm || Minnesota || FSI || 74-96 || Griffith (17) || Griffith (7) || White (4) || Conseco Fieldhouse  9,234 || 0-2
|- align="center" bgcolor="bbffbb"
| 3 || June 9 || 7:00 pm || Seattle || ESPN2 || 73-66 || Douglas (20) || Sutton-Brown (10) || Hoffman (4) || Conseco Fieldhouse  7,253 || 1-2
|- align="center" bgcolor="bbffbb"
| 4 || June 12 || 7:00 pm || Los Angeles ||  || 73-61 || Hoffman (14) || Bevilaqua, Catchings, Sutton-Brown (5) || Catchings, Douglas (5) || Conseco Fieldhouse  9,320 || 2-2
|- align="center" bgcolor="bbffbb"
| 5 || June 19 || 7:30 pm || @ Detroit ||  || 66-54 || Catchings (15) || Sutton-Brown (9) || Catchings (4) || Palace of Auburn Hills  7,725 || 3-2
|- align="center" bgcolor="bbffbb"
| 6 || June 21 || 6:00 pm || Detroit || NBA TVFSI || 82-70 || Douglas (23) || Sutton-Brown (9) || Catchings (6) || Conseco Fieldhouse  7,610 || 4-2
|- align="center" bgcolor="bbffbb"
| 7 || June 26 || 7:30 pm || @ New York ||  || 82-81 (OT) || Douglas (28) || Hoffman (14) || Douglas (4) || Madison Square Garden  9,304 || 5-2
|- align="center" bgcolor="bbffbb"
| 8 || June 27 || 7:00 pm || New York || MSG || 63-54 || Hoffman (14) || Catchings (11) || Catchings (4) || Conseco Fieldhouse  8,481 || 6-2
|-

|- align="center" bgcolor="bbffbb"
| 9 || July 2 || 7:00 pm || Connecticut || NBA TVFSI || 67-53 || Douglas, Sutton-Brown (14) || Sutton-Brown (14) || Catchings (5) || Conseco Fieldhouse  6,468 || 7-2
|- align="center" bgcolor="bbffbb"
| 10 || July 5 || 6:00 pm || Atlanta ||  || 78-74 || Sutton-Brown (22) || Catchings, Sutton-Brown (9) || Catchings (5) || Conseco Fieldhouse  7,024 || 8-2
|- align="center" bgcolor="bbffbb"
| 11 || July 10 || 8:30 pm || @ Chicago ||  || 83-54 || Murphy (15) || Sutton-Brown (7) || Hoffman, January (6) || UIC Pavilion  4,021 || 9-2
|- align="center" bgcolor="bbffbb"
| 12 || July 15 || 1:00 pm || Chicago ||  || 84-74 || Sutton-Brown (22) || Catchings (8) || Catchings, Douglas (8) || Conseco Fieldhouse  10,050 || 10-2
|- align="center" bgcolor="bbffbb"
| 13 || July 17 || 7:00 pm || Atlanta ||  || 84-79 || Douglas (25) || Catchings (8) || Bevilaqua (5) || Conseco Fieldhouse  7,975 || 11-2
|- align="center" bgcolor="ffbbbb"
| 14 || July 19 || 3:00 pm || @ Connecticut ||  || 61-67 || Douglas, Hoffman (15) || Hoffman (6) || Catchings, Douglas (4) || Mohegan Sun Arena  6,517 || 11-3
|- align="center" bgcolor="bbffbb"
| 15 || July 21 || 7:00 pm || @ Washington ||  || 82-70 || Catchings (28) || Catchings (10) || Bevilaqua (8) || Verizon Center  9,798 || 12-3
|- align="center" bgcolor="ffbbbb"
| 16 || July 23 || 12:30 pm|| @ San Antonio ||  || 65-84 || Davenport (13) || Davenport (6) || January (6) || AT&T Center  9,985 || 12-4
|- align="center" bgcolor="bbffbb"
| 17 || July 28 || 7:00 pm || Washington || || 85-81 || Douglas (34) || Hoffman (10) || Bevilaqua, Douglas (3) || Conseco Fieldhouse  5,904 || 13-4
|- align="center" bgcolor="bbffbb"
| 18 || July 30 || 7:00 pm || Connecticut || FSI || 94-85 (OT) || Douglas (32) || Hoffman (8) || Bevilaqua (4) || Conseco Fieldhouse  6,538 || 14-4
|-

|- align="center" bgcolor="bbffbb"
| 19 || August 2 || 4:00 pm || @ Washington || || 87-79 || Douglas (24) || Catchings (9) || Catchings (5) ||  Verizon Center  11,595 || 15-4
|- align="center" bgcolor="bbffbb"
| 20 || August 5 || 7:00 pm || Chicago || NBA TVCN100 || 76-67 || Douglas (14) || Murphy (7) || Bevilaqua, January (3) || Conseco Fieldhouse  6,581 || 16-4
|- align="center" bgcolor="bbffbb"
| 21 || August 8 || 10:00 pm || @ Phoenix ||  || 90-83 || Douglas (28) || Douglas (10) || Catchings, Douglas (5) || US Airways Center  9,867 || 17-4
|- align="center" bgcolor="ffbbbb"
| 22 || August 10 || 10:30 pm || @ Los Angeles ||  || 63-75 || Douglas (16) || Catchings, Moore (6) || Hoffman (3) || STAPLES Center  8,263 || 17-5
|- align="center" bgcolor="bbffbb"
| 23 || August 13 || 8:00 pm || @ Minnesota ||  || 91-81 || Hoffman (24) || Hoffman (10) || Bevilaqua, Dixon (4) || Target Center  7,156 || 18-5
|- align="center" bgcolor="bbffbb"
| 24 || August 15 || 7:00 pm || Detroit ||  || 82-59 || Douglas (19) || Catchings (9) || Douglas (4) || Conseco Fieldhouse  9,963 || 19-5
|- align="center" bgcolor="ffbbbb"
| 25 || August 20 || 10:00 pm || @ Sacramento ||  || 62-67 || Douglas (21) || Catchings (9) || January (6) || ARCO Arena  6,290 || 19-6
|- align="center" bgcolor="ffbbbb"
| 26 || August 22 || 10:00 pm || @ Seattle ||  || 60-74 || Douglas (12) || Catchings, Hoffman (7) || Catchings (7) || KeyArena  8,273 || 19-7
|- align="center" bgcolor="bbffbb"
| 27 || August 27 || 7:00 pm || San Antonio || NBA TVFSI || Catchings (20) ||  || Catchings (8) || Bevilaqua, Douglas (3) || Conseco Fieldhouse  6,836 || 20-7
|- align="center" bgcolor="ffbbbb"
| 28 || August 29 || 7:00 pm || Sacramento ||  || 78-79 || Douglas (24) || Sutton-Brown (7) || Bevilaqua (6) || Conseco Fieldhouse  8,579 || 20-8
|-

|- align="center" bgcolor="ffbbbb"
| 29 || September 2 || 7:00 pm || Phoenix || NBA TVFSI || 90-106 || Catchings (27) || Catchings (12) || Catchings (5) || Conseco Fieldhouse  7,446 || 20-9
|- align="center" bgcolor="ffbbbb"
| 30 || September 4 || 7:30 pm || @ Detroit ||  || 63-70 (OT) || Catchings (14) || Catchings (13) || 4 players (3) || Palace of Auburn Hills  7,230 || 20-10
|- align="center" bgcolor="bbffbb"
| 31 || September 6 || 4:00 pm || Washington ||  || 72-61 || Catchings (20) || Sutton-Brown (11) || Hoffman (4) || Conseco Fieldhouse  9,702 || 21-10
|- align="center" bgcolor="bbffbb"
| 32 || September 8 || 7:30 pm || @ New York ||  || 69-63 || Catchings, Douglas (17) || Catchings (10) || Douglas (4) || Madison Square Garden  7,583 || 22-10
|- align="center" bgcolor="ffbbbb"
| 33 || September 10 || 8:00 pm || @ Chicago  ||  || 79-86 || Douglas (25) || Catchings (10) || Douglas, January (4) || UIC Pavilion  2,902 || 22-11
|- align="center" bgcolor="ffbbbb"
| 34 || September 13 || 3:00 pm || @ Connecticut || WCTX || 85-95 || Catchings, Davenport, Dixon, Murphy (13) || Murphy (6) || Wirth (7) || Mohegan Sun Arena  9,047 || 22-12
|-

| All games are viewable on WNBA LiveAccess

Postseason

|- align="center" bgcolor="bbffbb"
| 1 || September 17 || 7:00 pm || @ Washington || ESPN2 || 88-79 || Catchings (26) || Catchings (12) || Bevilaqua, Catchings, January (3) || Comcast Center  6,332 || 1-0
|- align="center" bgcolor="bbffbb"
| 2 || September 19 || 7:00 pm || Washington || NBA TV || 81-74 (OT) || Catchings (24) || Catchings (16) || Catchings, Douglas (5) || Conseco Fieldhouse  9,655 || 2-0
|-

|- align="center" bgcolor="ffbbbb"
| 1 || September 23 || 8:00 pm || @ Detroit || ESPN2 || 56-72 || Douglas (16) || Catchings (11) || Bevilaqua, Douglas (5) || Palace of Auburn Hills  7,214 || 0-1
|- align="center" bgcolor="bbffbb"
| 2 || September 25 || 7:00 pm || Detroit || NBA TV || 79-75 || Catchings (22) || Catchings (9) || Catchings (5) || Conseco Fieldhouse  9,210 || 1-1
|- align="center" bgcolor="bbffbb"
| 3 || September 26 || 7:00 pm || Detroit || NBA TV || 72-67 || Sutton-Brown (17) || Catchings (8) || Catchings (5) || Conseco Fieldhouse  18,165 || 2-1
|-

|- align="center" bgcolor="ffbbbb"
| 1 || September 29 || 9:00 pm || @ Phoenix || ESPN2 || 116-120 (OT) || Douglas (30) || Hoffman (8) || January (7) || US Airways Center  11,617 || 0-1
|- align="center" bgcolor="bbffbb"
| 2 || October 1 || 9:00 pm || @ Phoenix || ESPN2 || 93-84 || Catchings (19) || Catchings (9) || Catchings (11) || US Airways Center  16,758 || 1-1
|- align="center" bgcolor="bbffbb"
| 3 || October 4 || 4:00 pm || Phoenix || ESPN2 || 86-85 || Hoffman (18) || Catchings (12) || Catchings, Douglas (7) || Conseco Fieldhouse  18,165 || 2-1
|- align="center" bgcolor="ffbbbb"
| 4 || October 7 || 7:30 pm || Phoenix || ESPN2 || 77-90 || Catchings (24) || Catchings (12) || Catchings, Douglas (4) || Conseco Fieldhouse  18,165 || 2-2
|- align="center" bgcolor="ffbbbb"
| 5 || October 9 || 9:00 pm || @ Phoenix || ESPN2 || 86-94 || Sutton-Brown (22) || Catchings (9) || Douglas (9) || US Airways Center  17,313 || 2-3
|-

Regular Season statistics

Player statistics

Team statistics

Awards and honors
Tamika Catchings was named WNBA Eastern Conference Player of the Week for the week of June 22, 2009.
Tammy Sutton-Brown was named WNBA Eastern Conference Player of the Week for the week of June 29, 2009.
Katie Douglas was named WNBA Eastern Conference Player of the Week for the week of July 27, 2009.
Katie Douglas was named WNBA Eastern Conference Player of the Week for the week of August 3, 2009.
Tamika Catchings was named to the 2009 WNBA All-Star Team as an Eastern Conference starter.
Katie Douglas was named to the 2009 WNBA All-Star Team as an Eastern Conference starter.
Tamika Catchings was named to the All-WNBA First Team.
Katie Douglas was named to the All-WNBA Second Team.
Tamika Catchings was named the Defensive Player of the Year.
Tamika Catchings was named to the All-Defensive First Team.
Tully Bevilaqua was named to the All-Defensive First Team.

References

Indiana
Indiana Fever seasons
Eastern Conference (WNBA) championship seasons
Indiana Fever